Struycken is a Dutch surname. Notable people with the surname include:

Carel Struycken (born 1948), Dutch actor, brother of Peter
Peter Struycken (born 1939), Dutch artist
Teun Struycken (1906–1977), Dutch politician

Dutch-language surnames